Víctor Ruiz Orden (born 24 June 1993) is a Spanish middle- and long-distance runner. He's won two medals in the European Cross Country Championships, in the mixed relay event.

Personal best

Outdoors
 1500 Metres:		3:37.86 (Castellón, 2022)
 3000 Metres Steeplechase:		8:16.42 (Huelva, 2022)

Indoors
 1500 Metres:		3:42.75 (Sabadell, 2019)
 3000 Metres:			8:05.60 (Valencia, 2018)

International competitions

References

1993 births
Living people
Spanish male middle-distance runners
Spanish male long-distance runners
Spanish athletes
21st-century Spanish people